Strongylus is a genus of nematodes belonging to the family Strongylidae.

The genus has cosmopolitan distribution.

Species:

Strongylus edentatus 
Strongylus equinus 
Strongylus vulgaris

References

Nematodes